The "March of the Volunteers", originally titled the "March of the Anti-Manchukuo Counter-Japan Volunteers"(), has been the official national anthem of the People's Republic of China since 1978. Unlike previous Chinese state anthems, it was written entirely in vernacular Chinese, rather than in Classical Chinese.

The Japanese invasion of Manchuria saw a boom of nationalistic arts and literature in China. This song had its lyrics written first by the communist playwright Tian Han in 1934, then set to melody by Nie Er and arranged by Aaron Avshalomov for the communist-aligned film Children of Troubled Times (1935). It became a famous military song during the Second Sino-Japanese War beyond the communist faction, most notably the Nationalist general Dai Anlan designated it to be the anthem of the 200th Division, who fought in Burma. It was adopted as the PRC's provisional anthem in 1949 in place of the "Three Principles of the People" of the Republic of China (1912–1949) and the Communist "Internationale". In the Cultural Revolution, Tian Han was criticized and placed in prison, where he died in 1968. The song was briefly and unofficially replaced by "The East Is Red", then reinstated but played without lyrics, restored to official status in 1978 with altered lyrics, and finally the original version was restored in 1982.

History 

The lyrics of the "March of the Volunteers", also formally known as the National Anthem of the People's Republic of China, were composed by Tian Han in 1934 as two stanzas in his poem "The Great Wall", intended either for a play he was working on at the time or as part of the script for Diantong's upcoming film Children of Troubled Times. The film is a story about a Chinese intellectual who flees during the Shanghai Incident to a life of luxury in Qingdao, only to be driven to fight the Japanese occupation of Manchuria after learning of the death of his friend. Urban legends later circulated that Tian wrote it in jail on rolling paper or the liner paper from cigarette boxes after being arrested in Shanghai by the Nationalists; in fact, he was arrested in Shanghai and held in Nanjing just after completing his draft for the film. During March and April 1935, in Japan, Nie Er set the words (with minor adjustments) to music; in May, Diantong's sound director He Luting had the Russian composer Aaron Avshalomov arrange their orchestral accompaniment. The song was performed by Gu Menghe and Yuan Muzhi, along with a small and "hastily-assembled" chorus; He Luting consciously chose to use their first take, which preserved the Cantonese accent of several of the men. On 9 May, Gu and Yuan recorded it in more standard Mandarin for Pathé Orient's Shanghai branch ahead of the movie's release, so that it served as a form of advertising for the film.

Originally translated as "Volunteers Marching On", the English name references the several volunteer armies that opposed Japan's invasion of Manchuria in the 1930s; the Chinese name is a poetic variation—literally, the "Righteous and Brave Armies"—that also appears in other songs of the time, such as the 1937 "Sword March".

In May 1935, the same month as the movie's release, Lü Ji and other leftists in Shanghai had begun an amateur choir and started promoting a National Salvation singing campaign, supporting mass singing associations along the lines established the year before by Liu Liangmo, a Shanghai YMCA leader. Although the movie did not perform well enough to keep Diantong from closing, its theme song became wildly popular: musicologist Feng Zikai reported hearing it being sung by crowds in rural villages from Zhejiang to Hunan within months of its release and, at a performance at a Shanghai sports stadium in June 1936, Liu's chorus of hundreds was joined by its audience of thousands. Although Tian Han was imprisoned for two years, Nie Er fled toward the Soviet Union only to die en route in Japan, and Liu Liangmo eventually fled to the U.S. to escape harassment from the Nationalists. The singing campaign continued to expand, particularly after the December 1936 Xi'an Incident reduced Nationalist pressure against leftist movements. Visiting St Paul's Hospital at the Anglican mission at Guide (now Shangqiu, Henan), W.H. Auden and Christopher Isherwood reported hearing a "Chee Lai!" treated as a hymn at the mission service and the same tune "set to different words" treated as a favorite song of the Eighth Route Army.

The Pathé recording of the march appeared prominently in Joris Ivens's 1939 The 400 Million, an English-language documentary on the war in China. The same year, Lee Pao-chen included it with a parallel English translation in a songbook published in the new Chinese capital Chongqing; this version would later be disseminated throughout the United States for children's musical education during World War II before being curtailed at the onset of the Cold War. The New York Times published the song's sheet music on 24 December, along with an analysis by a Chinese correspondent in Chongqing. In exile in New York City in 1940, Liu Liangmo taught it to Paul Robeson, the college-educated polyglot folk-singing son of a runaway slave. Robeson began performing the song in Chinese at a large concert in New York City's Lewisohn Stadium. Its 3-disc album included a booklet whose preface was written by Soong Ching-ling, widow of Sun Yat-sen, and its initial proceeds were donated to the Chinese resistance. Robeson gave further live performances at benefits for the China Aid Council and United China Relief, although he gave the stage to Liu and the Chinese themselves for the song's performance at their sold-out concert at Washington's Uline Arena on 24 April 1941. Following the attack on Pearl Harbor and beginning of the Pacific War, the march was played locally in India, Singapore, and other locales in Southeast Asia; the Robeson recording was played frequently on British, American, and Soviet radio; and a cover version performed by the Army Air Force Orchestra appears as the introductory music to Frank Capra's 1944 propaganda film The Battle of China and again during its coverage of the Chinese response to the Rape of Nanking.

The "March of the Volunteers" was used as the Chinese national anthem for the first time at the World Peace Conference in April 1949. Originally intended for Paris, French authorities refused so many visas for its delegates that a parallel conference was held in Prague, Czechoslovakia. At the time, Beijing had recently come under the control of the Chinese Communists in the Chinese Civil War and its delegates attended the Prague conference in China's name. There was controversy over the third line, "The Chinese nation faces its greatest peril", so the writer Guo Moruo changed it for the event to "The Chinese nation has arrived at its moment of emancipation". The song was personally performed by Paul Robeson.

In June, a committee was set up by the Chinese Communist Party to decide on an official national anthem for the soon-to-be declared People's Republic of China. By the end of August, the committee had received 632 entries totaling 694 different sets of scores and lyrics. The March of the Volunteers was suggested by the painter Xu Beihong and supported by Zhou Enlai. Opposition to its use centered on the third line, as "The Chinese people face their greatest peril" suggested that China continued to face difficulties. Zhou replied, "We still have imperialist enemies in front of us. The more we progress in development, the more the imperialists will hate us, seek to undermine us, attack us. Can you say that we won't be in peril?" His view was supported by Mao Zedong and, on 27 September 1949, the song became the provisional national anthem, just days before the founding of the People's Republic. The highly fictionalized biopic Nie Er was produced in 1959 for its 10th anniversary; for its 50th in 1999, The National Anthem retold the story of the anthem's composition from Tian Han's point of view.

Although the song had been popular among Nationalists during the war against Japan, its performance was then banned in the territories of the Republic of China until the 1990s.

The 1 February 1966 People's Daily article condemning Tian Han's 1961 allegorical Peking opera Xie Yaohuan as a "big poisonous weed" was one of the opening salvos of the Cultural Revolution, during which he was imprisoned and his words forbidden to be sung. As a result, there was a time when "The East Is Red" served as the PRC's unofficial anthem. Following the 9th National Congress, "The March of the Volunteers" began to be played once again from the 20th National Day Parade in 1969, although performances were solely instrumental. Tian Han died in prison in 1968, but Paul Robeson continued to send the royalties from his American recordings of the song to Tian's family.

The tune's lyrics were restored by the 5th National People's Congress on 5 March 1978, but with alterations including references to the Chinese Communist Party, communism, and Chairman Mao. Following Tian Han's posthumous rehabilitation in 1979 and Deng Xiaoping's consolidation of power over Hua Guofeng, the National People's Congress resolved to restore Tian Han's original verses to the march and to elevate its status, making it the country's official national anthem on 4 December 1982.

The anthem's status was enshrined as an amendment to the Constitution of the People's Republic of China on 14 March 2004.
On 1 September 2017, The Law of the National Anthem of the People's Republic of China, which protects the anthem by law, was passed by the Standing Committee of the National People's Congress and took effect one month later. The anthem is considered to be a national symbol of China. The anthem should be performed or reproduced especially at celebrations of national holidays and anniversaries, as well as sporting events. Civilians and organizations should pay respect to the anthem by standing and singing in a dignified manner. Personnel of the People's Liberation Army, the People's Armed Police and the People's Police of the Ministry of Public Security salute when not in formation when the anthem is played, the same case for members of the Young Pioneers of China and PLA veterans.

Special administrative regions
The anthem was played during the handover of Hong Kong from the United Kingdom in 1997 and during the handover of Macau from Portugal in 1999. It was adopted as part of Annex III of the Basic Law of Hong Kong, taking effect on 1 July 1997, and as part of Annex III of the Basic Law of Macau, taking effect on 20 December 1999.

The use of the anthem in the Macau Special Administrative Region is particularly governed by Law No.5/1999, which was enacted on 20 December 1999. Article 7 of the law requires that the anthem be accurately performed pursuant to the sheet music in its Appendix 4 and prohibits the lyrics from being altered. Under Article 9, willful alteration of the music or lyrics is criminally punishable by imprisonment of up to 3 years or up to 360 day-fines and, although both Chinese and Portuguese are official languages of the region, the provided sheet music has its lyrics only in Chinese. Mainland China has also passed a similar law in 2017.

Nonetheless, the Chinese National Anthem in Mandarin now forms a mandatory part of public secondary education in Hong Kong as well. The local government issued a circular in May 1998 requiring government-funded schools to perform flag-raising ceremonies involving the singing of the "March of the Volunteers" on particular days: the first day of school, the "open day", National Day (1 October), New Year's (1 January), the "sport day", Establishment Day (1 July), the graduation ceremony, and for some other school-organized events; the circular was also sent to the SAR's private schools. The official policy was long ignored, but—following massive and unexpected public demonstrations in 2003 against proposed anti-subversion laws—the ruling was reiterated in 2004 and, by 2008, most schools were holding such ceremonies at least once or twice a year. From National Day in 2004, as well, Hong Kong's local television networks—aTV, TVB, and CTVHK—have also been required to preface their evening news with government-prepared promotional videos including the national anthem in Mandarin. Initially a pilot program planned for a few months, it has continued ever since. Viewed by many as propaganda, even after a sharp increase in support in the preceding four years, by 2006, the majority of Hongkongers remained neither proud nor fond of the anthem. On 4 November 2017, the Standing Committee of the National People's Congress decided to insert a Chinese National Anthem Law into the Annex III of the Basic Law of Hong Kong, which would make it illegal to insult or not show sufficient respect to the Chinese national anthem. On 4 June 2020, the National Anthem Bill was passed in Hong Kong after a controversial takeover of the Legislative Council.

Tune

A 1939 bilingual songbook which included the song called it "a good example of...copy[ing] the good points from Western music without impairing or losing our own national color". Nie's piece is a march, a Western form, opening with a bugle call and a motif (with which it also closes) based on an ascending fourth interval from D to G inspired by "The Internationale". Its rhythmic patterns of triplets, accented downbeats, and syncopation and use (with the exception of one note, F in the first verse) of the G major pentatonic scale, however, create an effect of becoming "progressively more Chinese in character" over the course of the tune. For reasons both musical and political, Nie came to be regarded as a model composer by Chinese musicians in the Maoist era. Howard Taubman, the New York Times music editor, initially panned the tune as telling us China's "fight is more momentous than her art" although, after US entrance into the war, he called its performance "delightful".

Lyrics

Original version

1978–1981 version

Variations 
The march has been remixed by various performers:
 The American musician Paul Robeson recorded it in Chinese and English for the 1941 album Chee Lai! Songs of New China.
 The Army Air Force Orchestra recorded an instrumental version as the theme for Frank Capra's 1944 Why We Fight VI: The Battle of China.
 The Slovenian group Laibach created an electronic version of the anthem with lyrics in both English and Mandarin for their album Volk.
 The British musician Damon Albarn included a loose and upbeat version on the soundtrack to his musical Monkey: Journey to the West.
 The German musician Holger Czukay included a cut-up instrumental version on his album Der Osten ist Rot ("The East Is Red").

See also 

 Historical Chinese anthems
 Flag of the People's Republic of China
 National Emblem of the People's Republic of China

Notes

References

External links 

 
 National Anthem of the People's Republic of China (EN)
 Official instrumental version, hosted by the People's Republic of China
 Semi-official vocal version, hosted by the China Internet Information Center
 "March of the Volunteers" at National Anthems

Asian anthems
National symbols of the People's Republic of China
1935 songs
Chinese patriotic songs
Chinese military marches
Articles containing video clips
National anthems
Songs written for films
National anthem compositions in G major